The Ham bank murder occurred on 10 November 1976, at a branch of Barclays Bank in the Ham section of London, resulting in the murder of a bank teller working at the branch. The victim was Angela Mary Woolliscroft, fatally wounded by a shotgun.

Background
In 1976, Angela Mary Woolliscroft (1956–1976), who was born in Surrey and lived in Chessington, was working as a teller at the Barclays Bank branch at Ham Parade, Upper Ham Road, Richmond when she was fatally wounded by a shotgun during a robbery; she died on the way to hospital. After a major police operation, Michael Hart was arrested, put on trial, and in November 1977 sentenced to life imprisonment. Hart was released in 2002.

Robbery
On 10 November 1976 at 12:30pm Angela Woolliscroft was working as a cashier at the Barclays Bank at Ham, Richmond. A heavily disguised man threatened her with a sawn-off shotgun and told her to "Give me some money". She passed him some money under the screen. The man then fired the shotgun, destroying the safety glass screen and blowing her backwards. She died on the way to hospital. The gunman had made off with about £2,500 (£18,402.29 in 2020).

The gunman had left behind a woman's yellow raincoat that had been used to hide the shotgun. The coat had belonged to a Miss Marshall, and it was her car that had been used for the robbery. Her Austin A40 had been taken from the car park of Bentalls in Kingston and then returned. Also found was a large pale orange plastic bag that had contained fertiliser that had been taken from Parkleys estate opposite the bank.

Barclays Bank offered a reward of £50,000 for information leading to the arrest of the gunman.

Hunt
The hunt for the killer was led by Detective Chief Superintendent James Sewell of Scotland Yard. Hart was interviewed after a tip-off but had an alibi; he had signed on at the police station in Basingstoke where he was on bail for other crimes in the morning and again in the afternoon. However, on 22 November he was stopped after a traffic accident and police found a Hendal .22 automatic. A search of his house found a box of Eley No 7 trap shooting cartridges. Both the pistol and ammunition had been stolen in Reading on 4 November; also stolen was a double-barrelled Reilly shotgun. At first, the ammunition appeared to not match that used to kill Angela, which had been gameshot. However, they found that the ammunition had been incorrectly labelled.

Trial
Hart was arrested and charged with murder on 20 January 1977. Hart (aged 38) pleaded not guilty to murder but guilty of manslaughter. He maintained that he cocked the gun only to frighten, and that it went off by accident when he tapped the glass screen. He was found guilty of murder on 3 November 1977 and sentenced to life imprisonment, with a recommendation that he should serve at least twenty-five years. He was released in 2002.

Memorials

Angela Woolliscroft was buried at Surbiton cemetery on 29 March 1977. The funeral service was held at St Catherine of Siena Roman Catholic Church, Chessington, and was attended by members of the murder squad, the local MP, the deputy mayor of Kingston, members of staff from Barclays and pupils from Holy Cross convent, New Malden; the coffin was escorted by members of Barclays Bank international hockey team.

A memorial plaque was placed inside the bank building at Ham with the wording "In fond memory of Angela Woolliscroft who died on 10th November 1976. A member of staff of this branch who will always be remembered by her colleagues." The bank closed in 2014 and the plaque was moved to the branch in George Street, Richmond. There is also a memorial bench outside the former bank building in Ham (now a Sainsbury's store) and three more were placed round Ham Common. A crystal vase was filled with red roses on the anniversary of her death.

References

1976 in London
1976 murders in the United Kingdom
November 1976 events in the United Kingdom
1970s murders in London
Bank robberies
Barclays
Ham, London
History of the London Borough of Richmond upon Thames
History of the Royal Borough of Kingston upon Thames
Monuments and memorials in London
Murder in London
Robberies in England
Violence against women in London
Female murder victims
Deaths by firearm in London